David Wyman is an American sound engineer. He was nominated for an Academy Award in the category Best Sound for the film Greyhound.

Selected filmography 
 Greyhound (2020; co-nominated with Warren Shaw, Michael Minkler and Beau Borders)

References

External links 

Living people
Place of birth missing (living people)
Year of birth missing (living people)
American audio engineers
21st-century American engineers